George Garnett (19 June 1865 – 15 May 1954) was a Guyanese cricketer. He played in eight first-class matches for British Guiana from 1887 to 1897.

See also
 List of Guyanese representative cricketers

References

External links
 

1865 births
1954 deaths
Guyanese cricketers
Guyana cricketers
Cricketers from Liverpool